TYR Sport, Inc. is an American designer, developer and manufacturer of competitive swim and triathlon apparel and related specialized athletics gear. It shares ownership with Swimwear Anywhere.

Company history
TYR was founded in Huntington Beach, CA by Joseph DiLorenzo, and Steve Furniss in 1985.

The name TYR is a reference to the Norse god Týr.

Sponsorship 
TYR sponsors many professional athletes collectively known as Team TYR, as well as the national swimming teams in the US and in Singapore. In 2018, TYR gained title rights to USA Swimming's domestic circuit, the Pro Swim Series. From season 8-11 of Baywatch, TYR logo appeared on each female lifeguards bathing suits.

Team TYR 

Lilly King

See also
 List of swimwear brands
 Aquapel, a technical racing swimsuit designed by TYR
 Aquashift, another technical racing swimsuit designed by TYR

Notes

External links
 Official website

Sportswear brands
American companies established in 1985
Sporting goods manufacturers of the United States
Swimwear manufacturers
Water polo equipment manufacturers